Lost Homeland is a 1980 Croatian film directed by Ante Babaja. It is based on Slobodan Novak's novel of the same name.

In 1999, a poll of Croatian film critics found it to be one of the best Croatian films ever made.

References

External links
 

1980 films
Croatian war drama films
1980s Croatian-language films
Yugoslav war drama films
Films directed by Ante Babaja
Films based on Croatian novels
Films set on islands